Jan-Richard Lislerud Hansen is a Norwegian handball player.

He made his debut on the Norwegian national team in 2004, and played 32 matches for the national team between 2004 and 2010. He competed at the 2007 World Men's Handball Championship.

References

External links

1983 births
Living people
Norwegian male handball players
Expatriate handball players
Norwegian expatriate sportspeople in Germany